Wanarn is a medium-sized Aboriginal community, located in the Goldfields–Esperance region of Western Australia, within the Shire of Ngaanyatjarraku.

Native title 
The community is located within the determined Ngaanyatjarra Lands (Part A) (WAD6004/04) native title claim area.

Governance 
The community is managed through its incorporated body, Wanarn (Aboriginal Corporation) (formally Wannan Community (Aboriginal Corporation)), incorporated under the Aboriginal Councils and Associations Act 1976 on 27 June 1989.

Town planning 
Wanarn Layout Plan No.1 has been prepared in accordance with State Planning Policy 3.2 Aboriginal Settlements. Layout Plan No.1 was endorsed by the community on 1 December 2003 and the Western Australian Planning Commission on 4 May 2004.

Notes

External links
 Office of the Registrar of Indigenous Corporations
 Native Title Claimant application summary

Towns in Western Australia
Shire of Ngaanyatjarraku
Aboriginal communities in Goldfields-Esperance